DMT: The Spirit Molecule is a 2010 documentary film based on a book of the same name by Dr. Rick Strassman. Directed by Mitch Schultz and starring Joe Rogan as narrator, the documentary deals primarily with the psychedelic and entheogenic drug N,N-Dimethyltryptamine (DMT) through the lens of interviews with those who have used the drug, either as part of Strassman's scientific studies, or in combination with MAOIs (as ayahuasca). In 2013, Adam Winstock, working off of data in the Global Drug Survey, hypothesized that the documentary may have led to increased popularity of DMT. In July 2018, Variety reported that the documentary was one of the most streamed on Netflix.

References 

2010 documentary films
2010 films
Psychedelic films
2010s English-language films